is a junction railway station located in the city of Ishinomaki, Miyagi Prefecture, Japan, operated by East Japan Railway Company (JR East).

Lines
Maeyachi Station is served by both the Kesennuma Line and the Ishinomaki Line. It is the southern terminus of the Kesennuma Line and is located 12.8 kilometers from the terminus of the Ishinomaki Line at Kogota Station. Since the March 2011 Tōhoku earthquake and tsunami, services beyond  have been replaced by a provisional bus rapid transit line, which also operates starting from this station.

Station layout
The station has one side platform and one island platform connected to the station building by a footbridge. The station is staffed.

Platforms

History
Maeyachi Station opened on October 28, 1912. The Yanaizu Line began operations from December 24, 1968 and was extended to Motoyoshi Station to become the Kesennuma Line in 1977. The station was absorbed into the JR East network upon the privatization of Japanese National Railways (JNR) on April 1, 1987. A train was derailed at the station on July 26, 2003 due to a magnitude 6.2 earthquake.

Passenger statistics
In fiscal 2018, the  station was used by an average of 161 passengers daily (boarding passengers only).

Surrounding area
Former Kanan Town Hall
Kanan Post Office

See also
 List of railway stations in Japan

References

External links

 
  video of a train trip from Rikuzen-Toyosato Station to Maeyachi Station in 2009, passing Nonodake Station at around 03:35 minutes and Wabuchi Station at around 05:48 minutes, without stopping.

Railway stations in Miyagi Prefecture
Ishinomaki Line
Kesennuma Line
Railway stations in Japan opened in 1912
Ishinomaki